Kaerepere is a small borough in Kehtna Parish, Rapla County in central Estonia.

References 

Boroughs and small boroughs in Estonia